Pierriche may refer to:
 Pierre Falcon
 Grande Pierriche and Petite Pierriche, tributaries of the Saint-Maurice River, Quebec, Canada